William, Bill or Billy Bass may refer to:
 William M. Bass (born 1928), American forensic anthropologist
 Sir William Bass, 2nd Baronet (1879–1952), British racehorse owner
 William Bass (brewer) (1717–1787), British entrepreneur founder of Bass Brewery
 Bill Bass (1922–1967), Canadian football player
 Big Mouth Billy Bass, an animatronic fish
 Billy Bass Nelson (born 1951), American musician

See also
Bass (surname)